Christ Lutheran Church and Parsonage, originally the German Evangelical Lutheran Church of Ellenville, is a historic Lutheran church and parsonage located at Ellenville, Ulster County, New York.  The church was built in 1862 in the Greek Revival style.  It was moved, enlarged, reoriented, and completely remodeled in 1903–1904 in the Gothic Revival style when moved to its present location.  It is a roughly L-shaped building, with a T-shaped main block consisting of a -story, gable-roofed front block and -story gable-roofed rear block.  Appended to it is a 1-story addition.  It features a two-tiered, square bell tower, central front entrance flanked by blind bays, and Gothic arched stained glass windows.  The parsonage is a 2-story, three-bay-wide, Greek Revival–style brick dwelling built about 1850.

It was listed on the National Register of Historic Places in 2010. It is located in the Ellenville Downtown Historic District.

References

German-American culture in New York (state)
Lutheran churches in New York (state)
Churches on the National Register of Historic Places in New York (state)
Carpenter Gothic church buildings in New York (state)
Greek Revival church buildings in New York (state)
Churches in Ulster County, New York
Churches completed in 1862
1862 establishments in New York (state)
National Register of Historic Places in Ulster County, New York
Historic district contributing properties in New York (state)